The French occupation of Thessaly took place in June 1917, during the First World War, as part of the Allied intervention in the Greek National Schism. The chief military clash of the occupation became known as the Battle of the Flag.

Events 
The French army occupied consecutively on June 11 – Elasson; June 12–14 – Larissa; on 13/15 June – Velestino, Volos and Trikala; on June 15/17 – Kalambaka, and on June 26 – Lamia.

The chief military confrontation of the operation occurred when the French attempted to disarm the 1/38 Evzone Regiment in Larissa, under the command of Lt. Colonel Athanasios Frangos. The regiment refused to obey the command to surrender its weapons, and retreated west towards the mountains. The French launched Moroccan sipahis in pursuit of the unit, encircling it and forcing it to surrender after clashes (named "Battle of the Flag", as the Greeks carried the regimental standard with them) that claimed the lives of 59 Greek officers and soldiers, as well as seven killed and 15 wounded on the French side.

At the same time the Allies issued an ultimatum to Constantine threatening to bombard Athens. As a result King Constantine I of Greece abdicated.

At least 200 royalist Greek MPs, municipal leaders, lawyers and doctors were introduced into a prison camp in Thessaloniki. The Thessaloniki concentration camp was surrounded by double rows of wire mesh, and the guard was made up of Cambodian and Senegalese soldiers.

See also
 Provisional Government of National Defence 
 National Schism

References

Sources

External links 
 Photos from the French Military Archive
 Photos from the French Military Archive
 Photos from the French Military Archive

Modern history of Thessaly
Military operations of World War I involving France
Greece in World War I
Macedonian front
1917 in Greece
France–Greece relations